Fitim Reçi (born 29 July 2002) is an Albanian professional footballer who plays as a midfielder for Besa Kavajë.

Career statistics

Club

Notes

References

External links
 Profile - FSHF

2002 births
Living people
Footballers from Kavajë
Albanian footballers
Association football midfielders
Besa Kavajë players
Kategoria e Parë players